Căpleni is a commune of 4,349 inhabitants situated in Satu Mare County, Romania along the border with Hungary. It is composed of a single village, Căpleni, and also included Cămin village until 2002, when it was split off to form a separate commune.

Etymology
The name "Cǎpleni" is the Romanian version of its Hungarian name, Kaplony, which derives from an Old Turkic personal name meaning "tiger".

Demographics
Ethnic groups (2011 census): 
Hungarians (90.4%)
Roma (4%)
Romanians (3.1%)
Germans (2.4%)

Natives
 Robert Roszel

References

Communes in Satu Mare County